Grevillea monticola is a species of flowering plant in the family Proteaceae and is endemic to the south-west of Western Australia. It is a spreading to erect shrub with toothed to pinnatifid leaves with sometimes branched clusters of pale cream-coloured to yellowish-cream flowers.

Description
The lower surface of the leaves is sometimes silky-hairy.

Taxonomy
This species was first formally described in 1839 by John Lindley, who gave it the name Anadenia aquifolium in A Sketch of the Vegetation of the Swan River Colony. In 1848, Carl Meissner moved it to the Grevillea genus, but since the name Grevillea aquifolium was unavailable, having been used for a different species, changed the name to Grevillea monticola in Johann Georg Christian Lehmann's Plantae Preissianae. The specific epithet (monticola) means "a dweller in mountains".

Distribution and habitatGrevillea monticola'' grows in forest and woodland with jarrah and wandoo on sandy or loamy soils over laterite, granite and ironstone and is found mainly in the Darling Range between Kelmscott, Beverley, Pingelly and Wandering, in the Avon Wheatbelt and Jarrah Forest bioregions of south-western Western Australia.

Ecology
This grevillea regenerates from seed only.

See also
 List of Grevillea species

References

monticola
Endemic flora of Western Australia
Eudicots of Western Australia
Proteales of Australia
Taxa named by John Lindley
Plants described in 1839